The Intelligence Bureau is a civilian intelligence agency in Pakistan. Established in 1947, the IB is Pakistan's oldest intelligence agency. DG IB is a 4 star (NATO OF-9) equivalent rank of the BPS apex scale in Pakistan. Appointments and supervision of its operations are authorized by the Prime Minister of Pakistan.

Brief history

The Intelligence Bureau originally part of the British Raj's Intelligence Bureau which was established by the British Army's Major General Sir  Charles MacGregor who, at that time, was Quartermaster General and head of the Intelligence Department for the British Indian Army at Shimla, in 1885. Prior to this appointment, Major General Sir MacGregor was sent to British Indian Empire by the Queen Victoria. The IB's objectives were to monitor Russian troops deployments in Afghanistan, fearing a Russian invasion of British India through the North-West during the late 19th century.

In the aftermath of the independence of Pakistan by the British Crown, the IB, like the armed forces was partitioned, with a Pakistan IB created in Karachi. Since, the IB is the oldest intelligence community; others being the Military Intelligence (MI) of Pakistan's military. The IB was initially Pakistan's only and main intelligence agency with the responsibility for strategic and foreign intelligences, as well as counter-espionage and domestic affairs.

Its poor performance with the MI and unsatisfactory detailing of the war with India in 1947 was however considered less than exemplary. Due to the fact, IB was concerned with internal security matters, and was not set up for foreign intelligence collection. These considerations ultimately led to the creation of the ISI in 1948 as it quickly took the charge of gathering strategic and foreign intelligence at all levels of command.

Appointment for IB's Director-General are made by the Prime Minister but the appointment has to be confirmed by the President. The IB is a civilian intelligence agency, and its DG have been appointed from the civil bureaucracy and the police; as well as retired military officials have also served as DG IB.

Operations
Since the 1950s–1980s, the IB was running active operations to monitor politicians, political activists, suspected terrorists, and suspected foreign intelligence agents.  Right after Dhaka Fall in 1971, the IB apprised the then Prime Minister of Pakistan, Zulfikar Ali Bhutto of coup discussions between the Commander-in-Chief, Gul Hassan Khan and Air Chief Marshal Abdul Rahim Khan. Bhutto and his close aides, including Ghulam Mustafa Khar, in a counter-coup invited both Generals to the President House under false pretenses and obtained their resignations. The IB keeps tabs on political operatives from countries it considers hostile to Pakistan's interests. In the 1990s, the IB gained international reputation when its agents had successfully infiltrated many of the terrorist organizations.

In 1996, the IB was granted control of government censorship programs, controlling information dissemination via mail, wire, or electronic medium. In the 1990s, the IB remained actively involved to curb sectarianism and the fundamentalism in the country. Many of its operations were directed towards infiltration, conducting espionage, counterespionage, and providing key information on terrorist organizations. After the disastrous 9/11 terrorist attacks in the United States, the IB played its role as a stakeholder of the government. IB's successful infiltration techniques has led to the capture and detainment of many of high-profile terrorists and sectarian militants. Moreover, it has been instrumental in efforts to break terrorist networks and organised crime rackets throughout the country especially Karachi through its sophisticated human and technical intelligence apparatus. The agency had also been blamed for its belligerent role in Operation Clean-up at Karachi in 1991–92 and 1994–96.

The IB is considered to be a main tool of the government to pacify opposition elements and is sometimes viewed as a government toppling machine. One case under discussion in the Supreme Court of Pakistan is for the alleged involvement of the agency in destabilising the Punjab Government in 2008.

Constitutionality and powers

The IB agents have no formal arrest powers, and its suspects are often apprehended and interrogated by the FIA agents at the request of the IB officials.

The IB also passes on intelligence gained through infiltration between other Pakistan's intelligence community, police, and other Law enforcement units. The Bureau also grants the necessary security clearances to Pakistani diplomats and judges before they take the oath. Powers granted by the government, the IB also intercepts and opens regular mails and letters on a daily basis.

Designations

Organization

List of IB officers martyred in operational duties

1993: Abdul Latif Baloch 
1983: Aman-Ullah Khan, Director General
2008: Khaliq uz zaman, Inspector
2009: Qamar Anees Shaheed, Assistant Sub Inspector
2010: Saif Ullah Khalid, Inspector
2010: Kashif khan
2011: Hassan Raza
2011: Alam Khan, Sub Inspector
2011: Abdul Razzaq, Inspector
2011: Arshad Ghayas, Assistant Sub Inspector
2011: Siraj, Deputy Director
2012: Qamar Raza
2012: Bashir Khan, Inspector
2013: Muhammad Ali, Sub-Inspector
2013: Khawaja Abdul Wahab Inspector Sargodha
2013: Mazhar Awan Sub Inspector'Sargodha2013: Mazhar Ali, Sub Inspector Sargodha
2013: Agha Aatif Khan, Assistant Sub Inspector Sargodha
2013: Abdul Mueed Hamirani, Assistant Director
2013: Sajid Hussain Zahidi, Assistant Director
2014: Manan Shah, Inspector
2014: Rana Saad Noorani
2016: Usman Gul, Inspector
2021 khan bahadur , Sub inspector
2022 Muzahir Hussain Bangash, APS
2022 Amjad Khan , Assistant Sub inspector
2022 Najeeb Khan , Assistant Sub inspector

List of IB chiefs
Faisal ur rehman
Major Tayyab Raza, Nov, 1982
Brig. Imtiaz Ahmad, 1990-1993
 Maj.(R) Masood Shareef 1993 –1996
 Col (R) Iqbal Niazi, August 1998 – October 1999
 Major Gen Rafi Ullah Niazi 1999 - ???
 Maj Gen (R) Talat Munir, ? – October 2002
 Col (R) Bashir Wali Mohmmand, October 2002 – February 2003
 Brig (R) Ijaz Shah, February 2004 – March 2008
 Tariq Ahmed Lodhi, March 2008 – August 2008
 Shoaib Suddle, August 2008 – May 2009
 Javed Noor, May 2009 – October 2011
 Akhter Hassan Gorchani, July 2012 – March 2013
 Aftab Sultan, June 2013 – June 2018
 Dr. Suleman Khan, May 2018 -July 2018
 Ihsan Ghani, July 2018 - August 2018
 Shujaat Ullah Qureshi, August 2018 - September 2018 
 Dr Suleman Khan, September 2018 – April 2022
 Fuad Asadullah Khan S(ST), T(ST), nsc, April 2022 - To present

 See also 
 Government of Pakistan
Federal Secretary
Police Service of Pakistan

 References 

Bibliography
 Gauhar, Altaf. "How Intelligence Agencies Run Our Politics". The Nation''. September 1997: 4.

Intelligence Bureau jobs==External links==
 Thirteen spymasters gather to stare at each other
 Former IB chiefs meet 'secretly' over dinner
 Pakistani Defence Overview of Intelligence
 Brig (retd) Ejaz Shah
 Maj (retd) Masood Sharif Khan Khattak
 IB deputy director shot dead in Karachi
 IB officer shot dead in Peshawar
 Supreme Court hearing case for involvement of IB in toppling Provincial Government 

 
Pakistani intelligence agencies
Pakistan federal departments and agencies
1947 establishments in Pakistan
Government agencies established in 1947